The Ituri Rainforest is a rainforest located in the Ituri Province of northeastern Democratic Republic of the Congo. The forest's name derives from the nearby Ituri River which flows through the rainforest, connecting firstly to the Aruwimi River and finally into the Congo.

Geography
The climate is warm and humid, as exemplified by the nearby city of Bunia, which however is at a slightly higher elevation. About one-fifth of the rainforest is made up of the Okapi Wildlife Reserve, a World Heritage Site.

It is also the home of the Mbuti pygmies, one of the hunter-gatherer peoples living in equatorial rainforests characterised by their short height (below , on average). They were also the subject of a well-known study by Colin Turnbull, The Forest People, which was published in 1962.

The Ituri rainforest was first traversed by Europeans in 1887 by Henry Morton Stanley on his Emin Pasha Relief Expedition.

References

External links
 Blog by Biologists working on conservation in the Ituri forest
 Osfac
 

Geography of the Democratic Republic of the Congo
Tropical and subtropical moist broadleaf forests
Forests of the Democratic Republic of the Congo
Northeastern Congolian lowland forests